Riddim Ribbon featuring The Black Eyed Peas is the first installment in Tapulous' series of music games, succeeded by Riddim Ribbon Free. It features three tracks by The Black Eyed Peas plus more tracks that can be purchased from Apple's in-app purchase. Previously Tapulous had created games in the Tap Tap series including Tap Tap Revenge, Tap Tap Revenge 2 and Tap Tap Revenge 3.

Gameplay
In Riddim Ribbon the player plays the part of a DJ and guides a spinning marble down a ribbon to try to create remixes in songs. The player must follow the ribbon to keep gaining points. If the player falls off of the ribbon they lose points and their streak.  Every level is harder to play with more turns, and jumps.

Riddim Ribbon allows players to create their own remixes. At each checkpoint a player can decide which direction to turn and can choose a different remix.

Riddim Ribbon also allows players to challenge their friends on the remixes they make to see who can get a better score.

Riddim Ribbon is played by moving the iPod Touch or iPhone to turn the rolling marble and keep it on track.

Soundtracks
Riddim Ribbon features three artists; Tiesto, The Black Eyed peas and Benny Benassi. Tapulous has also announced that they expect to have more music soon.

Black Eyed Peas helped create the entire game. On the day it was released will.i.am a rapper and DJ for Black Eyed Peas said "I am so excited about this game...  it makes you re-think the concept of playing a song...  It makes you re-think the remix..."

Remixes
Along with the base songs there are also many remixes. These remixes were created by DJ's including will.i.am, David Guetta, and Robbie Rivera

Development and History
On September 28, 2009, a video was released of Bart Decrem the company's CEO, announcing the new game, Riddim Ribbon, developed by Tapulous and Seek Mobile Interactive utilizing the SeekTech engine. On February 8, 2010 it was released for the iPhone across the world.

1.0.2
The first update of the game within days of the release, and fixed many minor bugs that were found by users within the first few days.

A new release is expected by users addressing many issues with Riddim Ribbon within the first few weeks of release.

1.0.3
On February 18, 2010 the second update was released. The update featured some wanted features by users and overall made players happier.

Levels were made easier to unlock. A sensitivity bar was added to the options menu allowing players to choose how sensitive the turn movements were. Some of the audio effects were changed as well.

1.0.3 was the first large update released by Tapulous however more updates are expected by players in the future.

Reception
Within 24 hours of the release of Riddim Ribbon it had become the 15th most popular game in the iTunes Store. Later that day it hit the number 4 most grossed and downloaded app. In less than 72 hours after the release, Riddim Ribbon later reached #1 for Top Paid Music Game jumping ahead of Rock Band. Just hours later Riddim Ribbon then became the highest grossing app in the app store.

The overall reception of Riddim Ribbon was fairly good. Although many people criticized Tapulous for making so few songs, they have promised to soon add "...more huge artists. New music [will be] added frequently!"

See also
Riddim Ribbon
Tapulous

External links 
Official website

References

2009 video games
IOS games
IOS-only games
Music video games
Tapulous games
Video games developed in the United States

de:Riddim Ribbon